Hipolit Cegielski (6 January 1813, Ławki – 30 November 1868, Posen (Poznań), Kingdom of Prussia) was a Polish businessman and social and cultural activist. He founded H. Cegielski – Poznań in 1846.

References
 Witold Jakóbczyk, Przetrwać na Wartą 1815-1914, Dzieje narodu i państwa polskiego, vol. III-55, Krajowa Agencja Wydawnicza, Warszawa 1989

External links
 

1815 births
1868 deaths
People from Trzemeszno
19th-century Polish businesspeople
People from the Grand Duchy of Posen
People from the Province of Posen
Members of the Prussian House of Representatives
Polish social activists of the Prussian partition